Ken Jenkins (born August 28, 1940) is an American actor, best known for his role as Dr. Bob Kelso, the chief of medicine on the American comedy series Scrubs (2001–2009). He has also had notable appearances in many popular TV shows.

Early life
Jenkins was born in Dayton, Ohio and graduated from Wilbur Wright High School, Ohio in 1958.

Career
In 1969, Jenkins joined Actors Theatre of Louisville under the leadership of Jon Jory, where he served as a company member for three years.

Jenkins appeared on episodes of Homefront, The X-Files, Babylon 5, Star Trek: The Next Generation, Wiseguy, Early Edition, and Beverly Hills, 90210, and starred in Scrubs in the first eight seasons as a main cast member and guest-starred in the ninth and final season. His character, Dr. Bob Kelso, is his most recognizable role to date.

Jenkins has appeared in many films throughout his career, including The Wizard of Loneliness, Executive Decision, The Abyss, Air America, Last Man Standing, Fled, Gone in 60 Seconds, I Am Sam, The Sum of All Fears, Matewan, Courage Under Fire, and the 1998 remake of Psycho. He appeared as  Fran Goldsmith's father in Stephen King's TV miniseries, The Stand. Jenkins also had a role in Clockstoppers.

Jenkins also had a recurring role on Cougar Town, as Jules- (played by Courteney Cox) father. Jenkins  appears in The Blanks' music video for "Guy Love" as the owner of an L.A. bar, as he appeared with The Blanks in Scrubs, most prominently band member Sam Lloyd, who starred as regular Ted Buckland.

Jenkins portrayed Representative Howard W. Smith in the 2016 HBO TV movie All the Way, in which Smith's segregationist views posed as a central and divisive opposition to President Lyndon B. Johnson's proposal of the Civil Rights Act of 1964. Jenkins was the voice of Blister on Harvey Beaks. 

Jenkins can also sing and play the acoustic guitar, and is seen doing so on the Scrubs episodes "My Tuscaloosa Heart" and "My Musical", and in the Cougar Town episode "You Don't Know How It Feels".

Filmography

Film

Television

References

External links

1940 births
American male film actors
American male television actors
American male voice actors
20th-century American male actors
21st-century American male actors
Antioch College alumni
Living people
Male actors from Louisville, Kentucky
Male actors from Dayton, Ohio